The 1979 Premier League was the third season of the National Soccer League, the former top Australian professional league for association football clubs since its establishment in 1977. Marconi Fairfield secured a first National Soccer League title.

League table

Results

Finals series
The top four teams in the league entered a play-off series. The winner of the Finals series was not considered the overall winner of the 1979 National Soccer League.

Round 1

Round 2

Round 3

Grand Final

Season statistics

Top scorers

Individual awards

Player of the Year: Ivo Prskalo (Marconi Fairfield)
U-21 Player of the Year: Eddie Krncevic (Marconi Fairfield)
Top Scorer(s): Mark Jankovics (Marconi Fairfield – 18 goals)
Coach of the Year: Les Scheinflug (Marconi Fairfield)

References

OzFootball Archives - 1979 NSL Season

1977
1
Aus